The Roman Catholic Diocese of Yanggu/Yangku is a diocese located in Yanggu in the Ecclesiastical province of Jinan, and is centered in the Chinese province of Shandong.

History
 December 13, 1933: Established as Apostolic Prefecture of Yanggu from the Apostolic Vicariate of Yanzhoufu
 July 11, 1939: Promoted as Apostolic Vicariate of Yanggu
 April 11, 1946: Promoted as Diocese of Yanggu

Leadership
 Bishops of Yanggu (Roman rite)
 Bishop Joseph Zhao Feng-chang (2000–present)
 Bishop Joseph Li Bing-yao, S.V.D. (1990–1995)
 Bishop Thomas Niu Huiqing (April 11, 1946–February 28, 1973)
 Vicars Apostolic of Yanggu (Roman Rite)
 Bishop Thomas Niu Huiqing (January 12, 1943–April 11, 1946)
 Bishop Thomas Tien-ken-sin, S.V.D. (later Cardinal) (July 11, 1939–November 10, 1942)

References

 GCatholic.org
 Catholic Hierarchy

Roman Catholic dioceses in China
Christian organizations established in 1933
Roman Catholic dioceses and prelatures established in the 20th century
1933 establishments in China
Religion in Shandong
Yanggu County, Shandong